Žatec Brewery is a brewery in Žatec in the Czech Republic. The firm continues the traditions of industrial brewing beer in the region dating back to 1801.

Products 
 Žatec světlé (4.1% vol.)
 Žatec Premium (4.8% vol.)
 Žatec Export (5.1% vol.)
 Žatec Dark Label (5.7% vol.)
 Baronka Premium (5.3% vol.)
 Žatec Blue Label (4.6% vol.)
 Celia – bezlepkové pivo (4.5% vol.)
 Celia Dark – tmavé bezlepkové pivo (5.7% vol.)
 Cornish Steam lager (5.1% vol.)
 Sedmý schod (5.5% vol.)
 Plavčík (3.8% vol.)

History 
The tradition of brewing beer in Žatec spans over 700 years.

 1261 The first brewing guild with the legal right to brew beer in Žatec is formed.
 1798 The cornerstone is laid for the first industrial brewery in Žatec.
 1801 The first beer is brewed in Žatec's first industrial brewery.

See also 
 Beer in the Czech Republic
 Pilsner

References

External links

 

Breweries in the Czech Republic